Finkenkrug is a district of Falkensee, a town west of Berlin. It has been named after Alten Finkenkrug, a tar furnace in the "Bredower Forst".

History 

When the railway Berlin-Hamburg was opened on December 12, 1846, the area of Finkenkrug was a deserted landscape with rich arable fields interspersed with forest. Toward Dyrotz and the Königsgraben (kings ditch, also Russians ditch) the landscape transferred into an alder bush landscape with agricultural cultivated fields that belonged to the manor Seegefeld. Unpaved roads were in the north the "Nauener Straße" from Falkenhagen and the "Finkenkruger Straße" from Seegefeld, that in a westbound curve of the current "Hohlbeinstr." ended in the "Rohrbecker Weg". Toward the west in old maps of the 18th century the "Dyrotzer Weg" is marked.

Literature 
 Richard Wagner, Finkenkrug in seinem Jahrhundert, published by the 'Förderverein des Heimatmuseums Falkensee e.V.', 2001
 Richard Wagner, Illustrierte Geschichte von Falkensee, published by the 'Förderverein des Heimatmuseums Falkensee e.V.', 2003
 Neufinkenkrug und seine Entwicklung, published by the 'Verein zur Förderung von Neufinkenkrug', 1914
 Lehrer Rehfeld, Festschrift des Alten Finkenkrugs, 1927
 Kurt Ruppin, Seegefeld, 1994
 Falkensee, wie es früher war, Kulturamt der Stadt Falkensee, 1. Auflage 1994
 Chronik, 1961
 Hans-Ulrich Rhinow, Heimatgeschichte Falkensee und Region

External links 
History of Finkenkrug 

Localities in Havelland